Sales force may refer to:

Salesforce.com, an American technology company
A sales team